The Minister for Women is a minister within the Cabinet of Victoria tasked with the responsibility of overseeing the Victorian Government's laws and initiatives regarding women, and women's rights.

Natalie Hutchins has been the minister since June 2022.

Ministers

Reference List 

Victoria State Government
Ministers of the Victoria (Australia) state government
!
Women's rights in Australia